"Shumi Maritsa" was the Bulgarian national anthem from 1886 until 1947. The music was derived from the German folk song "Wenn die Soldaten durch die Stadt marschieren" that was very popular in Bulgaria in the mid-19th century. The original text was written by Nikola Zhivkov, a head teacher in Veles (now in North Macedonia). The lyrics were edited many times, most notably in 1912 by the poet Ivan Vazov. The title refers to the Marica river. It literally translates to "Marica makes noise" but the connotation is closer to "Marica roars".

History

History of the melody 
On 1839 in Breslau (Wroclaw), the poet Alexander Kosmar created the satirical farce "The Pirates". Originally, the song was performed with entertainment and satirical sense in cabarets. It quickly gained popularity, and soon the melody of the song became the German song "Wenn die Soldaten durch die Stadt marschieren".

The melody of the anthem was introduced to Bulgaria by Atanas Gratinski. He heard the song in the city of Shumen, when the Crocus Orchestra from Hungarian emigrants that settled in the city performed the German song "Wenn die Soldaten durch die Stadt marschiern" (When the soldiers march through the city). The melody inspired Gratinski to adjusts the song to the poem "Sunshine" that he made from 1855 until 1856 and taught the song to his students. The song become popular in Bulgaria.

In the beginning of 1925, a competition for musical harmonization of the anthem was announced. The scientific archive of the Bulgarian Academy of Sciences maintains 15 projects for the composition, some of which composed anonymously, while the other projects was composed by Georgi Atanasov, Ivan Kasabov, Nikola Yordanov, Dobri Hristov and other composers.

In 1935 a project was made to merge Shumi Maritsa and the royal anthem of Bulgaria. The project was worked by Pancho Vladigerov and Menakhem Bensusan, but the whole project failed. However, after the project, the royal anthem of Bulgaria is performed after Shumi Maritsa without interruption.

History of the lyrics 

Nikola Zhivkov created the lyrics of the song when he was among the Bulgarian volunteers who participated in the Serbian-Turkish war that broke out in 1876. He created the song because of his admiration to the personality and charisma of General Mikhail Chernyayev, who commands the Bulgarian volunteers. The song is composed by the title of "Chernyayev March". The melody of the song is inspired by the musical poem "Sunshine".

The song "Chernyayev March" was first published in 1877 in the newspaper "Sekydnevny Novinar" by S.P.Bobekov, and then in 1878 in the collection of songs "Gusla i pesni".

The title of the song was later changed to "Shumi Maritsa", at the play "Ilyo Voyvoda". The song was published at the end of the play.

The lyrics of the song underwent a major revision by poet Ivan Vazov in 1912. Covered by the patriotic enthusiasm after the first victories during the Balkan War, the folk poet wrote almost entirely new lyrics of the song, borrowing motifs from his own poem "Maritsa rushes bloodily" (which would be the first and second line of the song). He published it for the first time on December 4, 1912 with the following editorial note:

Another minor revision was done in 1914. The revision appeared in the poems collection "Under the Thunder of Victories." Because of the World War I, the revision gained small attention. This has led Ivan Vazov to republish the text in his poem "Songs for Macedonia 1913-1916" printed in 1916 with the following remark: 

There are some other attempts to revise the text in the following years, but proved unsuccessful.

Usage of the anthem 
The anthem was used as the official Bulgarian anthem from the Bulgarian unification in 1885, and was relinquished in 1947, replaced by the anthem "Republiko nasha, zdravey!".

Notable performances of the anthem 
The anthem was last played as the national anthem of Bulgaria on January 1, 1947 by the Red Army's Alexandrov Ensemble, at a reception given by the President of the 6th Grand National Assembly, Vasil Kolarov.

According to the newspaper "Fatherland Front", the Botev celebrations in Bulgaria was opened on June 2, 1947, with "Shumi Maritsa".

Status of the anthem in the Bulgarian People's Republic 
The anthem served as a de facto anthem in the Bulgarian People's Republic, due to the absence of mention of the anthem at the constitution of that time, the Dimitrov Constitution.

During the era of the Bulgarian People's Republic, Shumi Maritsa is almost always associated negatively. During these times, the creator of the lyrics for the song, Ivan Vazov, was considered as a petite bourgeoisie. In the regime, Shumi Maritsa is considered to be written by a bourgeois poet, performed in bourgeois times, and was reminiscent of the monarchical regime. Even though the anthem was considered bourgeois, there was no indication that the anthem was banned during the regime.

Proposals of the readoption of the anthem 
During the discussion for the new constitution of Bulgaria in the 7th Grand National Assembly, there are some proposals submitted for a new anthem. The most popular proposal include the readoption of Shumi Maritsa as the national anthem of Bulgaria.

Performance of the anthem in the battlefield   
The anthem was the standard march of the Bulgarian Army in the battlefield. During the Serbo-Bulgarian War and the Balkan Wars, the Bulgarian army fought with chanting "Shumi Maritsa" . The military orchestra constantly plays the anthem during the battle, even when their instruments are shot by enemy bullets and broken by grenades.

Russo-Turkish War 

During the second Battle of Shipka Pass in the Russo-Turkish War, the Russian command sees that the spiked position can not be held back any more. General Stoletov, the commander of the Bulgarian forces takes a decision to retreat. The Russian regiments retreat along the Gabrovo highway to slow Turkish troops. The Bulgarian volunteers are at the Shipka Peak, while the Turkish forces was en route to capture the Bulgarian positions. Bravely, Major Chilyayev stood on a rock and sang "Shumi Maritsa". When they hear, the volunteers stop and slam their march, throw themselves in a bayonet charge. The Turks see the frenzied Bulgarians in front of them and retreated from their position.

Serbo-Bulgarian War 

During the Battle of Slivnitsa, part of the Serbo-Bulgarian War in 1885, a large group of Serbian Army was defending their positions at Slivnitsa and was reinforced before by a 135-kilometer march from southern Bulgaria to the Slivnitsa position. When the two battalions of the Serbian Army' Danubian Regiment arrived on the battlefield, Captain Benderev as the commander of the Bulgarian Army issued order to take Serbian positions immediately. This attack of the Danube Regiment is the most glorious and most important moment in Bulgarian history. Without a fight, in the performance of Shumi Maritsa, the Danube Regiment quickly climbed on a steep cliff. When the Serbian army heard the sound of the Shumi Maritsa", the Serbian Army escaped panically. The attack by the Bulgarian army ends the battle with the Serbs retreating.

Balkan Wars

First Balkan War 
On October 16, 1912, at Karaağaç, the commander of the 18th King Ferdinand I regiment, Lieutenant Colonel Antonov sees the advancing Turkish infantry battalions. He takes over the regal shrine and with a sword taken out, under the sounds of Shumi Maritsa performed by the regimental brass band, he led the attack of his army. The attacking forces of the Turkish Army were dismissed, and the regiment's advance and division continued with complete success.

On the night of 12 March 1913, the commander of the 23rd "Shipka" Infantry Regiment receives the task of storming the Ayvaz Baba, a fort in the eastern sector of the Edirne defence. The regiment commander, Colonel Ivan Pashinov, judged that he would not be able to pass the wire barriers on the fortress. Nevertheless, he brought with him the regimental flag and, under the sounds of "Shumi Maritsa", performed by the regimental music, he led his regiment forward. Under a hail of bullets and shrapnels, the regiment overcome the enemy wire barriers and at 5.30 pm on March 13 the regimental flag is already waving over the captured Ayvaz Baba fort.

Second Balkan War 
During the Second Balkan War in the summer of 1913, when the Modra Wall (Serbia) attacked, the 34th "Trojan" Infantry Regiment, headed by its captain, found itself behind the right wing of the Serbs. Frightened by the setting, he orders the musicians to lie down in a clearing. At that time Trojans started the attack. The Captainmaster raises his subordinates and the boxing music starts playing "Shumi Maritza". This gives forces to the attackers, and the enemy begins escaping, as during the Serbian-Bulgarian War (1885). Of the captured prisoners, it is understood that against the Bulgarian four companies the Serbian command has opposed an infantry brigade with 2 artillery batteries and 22 machine guns. To the question of why their escapes have left their positions, the captives respond,

Lyrics

1914 revision

1912 revision

Original version from 1876

See also 
 "Anthem of His Majesty the Tsar"
 "Mila Rodino"

References

External links
 Listen to "Shumi Maritsa" (WMA files)

Bulgarian patriotic songs
Historical national anthems
National symbols of Bulgaria
European anthems